Love, Duty and Crime is a 1926 Colombian silent film directed by Vincenzo di Doménico and Pedro Moreno Garzón.

The film revolves around a young committed woman who falls for the painter who made his portrait, so she will be immersed in a conflict.

Cast
 Rafael Burgos
 Mara Meba
 Roberto Estrada Vergara
 Alejandro Barriga

External links
 
 El amor, el deber y el crimen at Proimágenes Colombia

1926 romantic drama films
1926 films
Colombian drama films
Colombian silent films
Colombian black-and-white films
Silent drama films